The Corallinaceae are one of the two extant Coralline families of red algae; they are differentiated from the morphologically similar Sporolithaceae by their formation of grouped sporangial chambers, clustered into sori.  The Corallinoideae is monophyletic; the other subfamilies form another monophyletic group.

Genera
The following genera are listed in the World Register of Marine Species:

Subfamily Amphiroideae 
Genus Amphiroa J.V. Lamouroux, 1812
Genus Lithothrix J.E. Gray, 1867
Subfamily Corallinoideae
Genus Alatocladia (Yendo) Johansen, 1969
Genus Arthrocardia Decaisne, 1842
Genus Bossiella P.C. Silva, 1957
Genus Calliarthron Manza, 1937
Genus Cheilosporum (Decaisne) Zanardini, 1844
Genus Chiharaea Johansen, 1966
Genus Corallina Linnaeus, 1758
Genus Ellisolandia 
Genus Haliptilon (Decaisne) Lindley, 1846
Genus Jania J.V. Lamouroux, 1812
Genus Marginisporum (Yendo) Ganesan, 1968
Genus Pachyarthron Manza, 1937
Genus Rhizolamiella Shevejko, 1982
Genus Serraticardia (Yendo) P.C. Silva, 1957
Genus Yamadaia Segawa, 1955
Subfamily Lithophylloideae
Genus Crodelia Heydrich, 1911
Genus Ezo Adey, Masaki & Akioka, 1974
Genus Lithophyllum Philippi, 1837
Genus Paulsilvella Woelkerling, Sartoni & Boddi, 2002
Genus Titanoderma Nägeli in Nägeli & Cramer, 1858
Subfamily Mastophoroideae 
Genus Hydrolithon Foslie, 1909
Genus Lesueuria Woelkerling & Ducker, 1987
Genus Mastophora Decaisne, 1842
Genus Metamastophora Setchell, 1943
Genus Neogoniolithon Setchell & Mason, 1943
Genus Paraspora Heydrich, 1900
Genus Pneophyllum Kützing, 1843
Genus Spongites Kützing, 1841
Subfamily Metagoniolithoideae
Genus Metagoniolithon Weber-van Bosse, 1904
Unassigned
Genus Archaeolithothamnion Foslie, 1898
Genus Archaeolithothamnium Rothpletz, 1891
Genus Dermatolithon Foslie, 1898
Genus Fosliella M.A. Howe, 1920
Genus Heteroderma Foslie, 1909
Genus Litholepis
Genus Lithoporella (Foslie) Foslie, 1909
Genus Masakia Kloszcova, 1987
Genus Masakiella Guiry & Selivanova, 2007
Genus Multisiphonia R. C. Tsao & Y. Z. Liang, 1974
Genus Paracolonnella Y.Z. Liang & R.C. Tsao, 1974
Genus Paraconophyton Y.Z. Liang & R.C. Tsao, 1974
Genus Porolithon Foslie, 1909
Genus Pseudogymnosolen Y.Z. Liang & R.C. Tsao, 1974
Genus Pseudolithophyllum Marie Lemoine, 1913

References

 
Red algae families